H49 may refer to :
 , a Royal Canadian Navy D-class destroyer
 , a Royal Navy D-class destroyer
 , a Royal Navy H-class submarine
 , a Royal Navy I-class destroyer
 Lioré et Olivier LeO H-49, a French flying boat
 Nelson H-49, an aircraft engine
 Paralytic strabismus